is a 1963 Japanese horror film directed by Ishirō Honda. The film stars Akira Kubo, Kumi Mizuno and Kenji Sahara. It is partially based on William Hope Hodgson's short story "The Voice in the Night" and is about a group of castaways on an island who are unwittingly altered by a local species of mutagenic mushrooms.

Matango was different from Honda's other films of the period as it explored darker themes and featured a more desolate look. Upon the film's release in Japan, it was nearly banned due to scenes that depicted characters resembling victims of the atomic bombings of Hiroshima and Nagasaki. The film was released directly to television in the United States in a shortened form. Retrospective reviews generally commented on how the film varied from Honda's other work, with its darker tone.

Plot
In a hospital in Tokyo, a university professor named Kenji Murai is visited by a man who asks him about the events that led him to the hospital. The story is about a group of crew and passengers on a day trip on a yacht, including Murai; his shipmate assistant Senzō Koyama; writer Etsurō Yoshida; celebrity Masafumi Kasai, the owner of the yacht; professional singer Mami Sekiguchi; and student Akiko Sōma. A sudden storm causes the yacht to nearly capsize. Though the boat remains upright, it sustains severe damage during the storm and drifts uncontrollably. The group arrive at a seemingly deserted island and begin to explore. They come across ponds full of fresh rainwater and a large forest of mushrooms. The yacht's skipper, Naoyuki, warns them not to eat the mushrooms because they might be poisonous.

As they cross the island, they come upon a wrecked yacht on the shore whose sails are rotted and its interior is covered with a mysterious mold. Finding that the mold is killed by cleaning products, they work to clear it from the ship. In doing so, they begin to suspect that the ship was connected to nuclear tests conducted in the vicinity of the island, with the resultant fallout forcing a bizarre mutation on various organisms native to the surrounding area, including the mushrooms. As the days pass, the group grows restless as their supply of food stores starts to run low. Kasai refuses to help find a way off the island and steals from their food stores instead. After becoming concerned about their provisions, Yoshida decides to try eating the mushrooms.

One night, as Kasai is raiding the food stores, he is attacked by a grotesque-looking man who promptly disappears after encountering the group. Suddenly, Yoshida's behavior begins to grow erratic, leading him to be locked inside Kasai's room right after he pulls a gun on the group. Naoyuki decides that in order to survive, the team must leave the island. The others disagree, leading him to depart on his own. Mami frees Yoshida and they attempt to take over the ship, shooting and killing Senzō in the process. Murai and Akiko manage to take control from the two and force them off the ship. Murai finds the yacht adrift and swims out towards it. He finds Naoyuki missing and a note left behind explaining that he is responsible for the deaths of his group and had jumped overboard. On the ship, Kasai is confronted by Mami, who entices him to follow her into the forest. Perpetual rainfall has caused wild fungal growth, and Kasai realizes that those who have been eating the mushrooms have turned into humanoid mushroom creatures themselves. The mushrooms are addictive and cannot be resisted after the first bite. Kasai is last seen collapsing as mushroom creatures begin to swarm him.

Others who have turned into mushroom creatures attack Akiko and Murai. They are separated and Akiko is kidnapped. As Murai tracks her down, he discovers that she has been fed mushrooms and is under their influence along with Mami, Yoshida, and Kasai. Murai attempts to rescue Akiko, but he is overwhelmed by the mushroom creatures and flees without her, making his way onto the yacht and escaping the island. Several days pass later, Murai is finally rescued. As he waits in the hospital, he begins to wonder if he should have stayed with Akiko on the island. His face is revealed to show signs of being infected with fungal growths. Murai states after that it did not matter whether he stayed or not, but he would have been happier there with Akiko. The screen fades as Murai notes that humans are not much different from the mushroom creatures.

Cast

Production

Writing
The film was based on a story in S-F Magazine which Masami Fukushima was an editor of. A treatment was written on the film by Shinichi Hoshi and Fukushima which was then made into a screenplay by Takeshi Kimura. The story itself was based on William Hope Hodgson's short story "The Voice in the Night", which originally appeared in the November 1907 issue of Blue Book.

The script was relatively faithful to Hodgson's story, but added a number of extra characters. Honda was also inspired by a news story about a group of rich kids who took their father's yacht far into the sea and had to be rescued. Early drafts featured characters paralleling their real-life counterparts, as well as reports of ships and aircraft vanishing in the Bermuda Triangle.

Filming

Director Ishirō Honda was better known for his kaiju (giant monster) films, but occasionally developed horror films such as The H-Man (1958) and The Human Vapor (1960), where characters become bizarre transformed beings. Honda's last film in this style was Matango. Critic Bill Cooke noted in Video Watchdog that Matango defies easy categorization as a film belonging to either the kaiju (monster) or kaidan (ghost) genres of the era. In his book Japanese Science Fiction, Fantasy, and Horror Films, Stuart Galbraith IV described it as a psychological horror film that "contains science fiction elements".

In their book Ishiro Honda: A Life in Film, from Godzilla to Kurosawa, Steve Ryfle and Ed Godziszewski stated that both thematically and visually, Matango was "uniquely dark" among Honda's films and was a radical departure from his brightly lit and lighthearted films Mothra and King Kong vs. Godzilla. Art director Shiegkazu Ikuno designed the stark look of the film. Ikuno was the apprentice of the production designer of Godzilla, Satoru Cuko. Assistant director Koji Kajita described Ikuno as being known for set designs that were "vanguard, experimental sets".  Tomoyuki Tanaka produced the film, with music by Sadao Bekku and cinematography by Hajime Koizumi.

According to Yoshio Tsuchiya, Honda took the project seriously, telling actors before production that the film was "a serious drama picture, so please keep this in mind and work accordingly". Tsuchiya also explained that in addition to the official ending of the film, a different ending was shot where Kubo's face was normal.

Special effects
Matango was Honda's first film to use the Oxberry optical printer, which Toho purchased from the United States to allow for better image compositing. The printer allowed the ability to superimpose up to five composite shots, allowing the crew to avoid costly hand-painted mattes and glass shots.

Release

Toho released the film in Japan on August 11, 1963. Honda described it later as a film that was not "a typical Japanese mainstream movie at all", saying, "When critics saw it, [they] didn't like it, so that was pretty much the end of that film". Matango was nearly banned in Japan because some of the makeup resembled the facial disfigurements characteristic of the victims of the atomic bombings of Hiroshima and Nagasaki.

Matango was Honda's first science fiction film not to receive a theatrical release in the United States. There, American International Television released it directly to television in 1965 as Attack of the Mushroom People. This version of the film had a run-time of 88 minutes. Toho produced an English-dubbed version of the film, but it is uncertain when it was officially released.

Prior to Matangos release on home video, Galbraith noted that the film was shown frequently on American television during the 1960s and 1970s, but as of 1994, it "ha[d] all but disappeared". Ryfle and Godziszewski stated that Matango was considered an obscure film for many years after its release.

The film was released on home video in the United Kingdom in the 1980s under the title Fungus of Terror. Media Blasters  issued Matango on DVD in the United States on March 15, 2005. It featured a generous selection of extras, including commentary by the film's male lead, Kubo, production sketches, an interview with special effects team member Teruyoshi Nakano, and other features. Tim Lucas of Sight & Sound described Tokyo Shock's release of the film as "a revelation to those of us who grew up watching pan-and-scanned, re-edited bastardisations of these films on television". Lucas also noted that "Matango looks splendid on Tokyo Shock's disc, its anamorphic transfer retaining the naturalistic colour of the earlier Toho Video laserdisc release with brighter contrast and a slightly more generous (2.53:1) screen width". He felt that "the English subtitles access adult dimensions of the story that were never apparent in the old television prints". Toho released the film on Blu-ray in Japan on November 3, 2017.

Reception
In a contemporary review, the Monthly Film Bulletin assessed an 89-minute English dub of the film. The review noted that the film was "not one of the best of Toho's special effect exercises though the mushroom people are quite fanciful and the mushrooms come in all shapes, sizes and colours", and that most scenes were "disappointingly dull" as "the whole thing sags miserably in the middle when characters get down to bickering among themselves".

Matango has been described as a "virtually unknown film", except to "aficionados of Asian cult cinema, fans of weird literature, and sleepless consumers of late-night television programming". The film has received relatively little scholarly attention. Galbraith described Matango as one of Toho's "most atypical and interesting films". He noted that the film was not as strong as its source story, and that the creatures in their final form were "rubbery and unconvincing", but that the film was "one of the most atmospheric horror films to ever come out of Japan". In his book Monsters Are Attacking Tokyo!, Galbraith later compared the English version with the Japanese original, giving the versions 2.5 and 3.5 stars, respectively. In another retrospective review, Lucas stated that the film was the best of Honda's non-kaiju themed horror films, and that it was a "well-crafted picture that parallels 1956's Invasion of the Body Snatchers". Cooke described the film as "a classic from Japan's early-Sixties horror boom" and as "some of the finest work of Ishiro Honda". He also opined that the film was one of Toho's "most colorful science-fiction productions" with a "rich and varied palette". In Leonard Maltin's film guide, the film received 2.5 out of 4 stars, with Maltin writing, "Initially slow-paced [it] grows into a disturbing, peculiarly intimate kind of horror, unusual for director Honda".

Aftermath and influence
Honda reflected on Matango decades afters its initial release, stating that it was a comment on the Rebel era" in which people were becoming addicted to drugs. Once you get addicted, it's a hopeless situation". He added that "no matter how good friends people are, even if they're the very best of friends, under certain conditions things can get very ugly". Actor Kubo declared that of the few monster or outer space-themed films which he acted in, Matango was his favorite. Director Steven Soderbergh stated he had wanted to make a remake of Matango, describing it as a film that he watched as a child that "scared the shit out of me". Soderbergh said he was unable to reach a deal with Toho, so the remake did not happen.

In his book analyzing the kaiju film, Jason Barr noted that Matango was the most famous of films of the genre between the 1960s and 1970s that focused on themes of metamorphosis and assault on human bodies. In the book Monsters and Monstrosity from the Fin de Siecle to the Millennium: New Essays, Camara stated that Matango would leave an imprint on Japanese cyberpunk influenced body horror films of the future such as Sogo Ishii's Electric Dragon 80.000 V, Shozin Fukui's Pinocchio 964 and Yoshihiro Nishimura's Tokyo Gore Police.

See also

 List of horror films of 1963
 List of Japanese films of 1963
 The Last of Us – a 2013 video game featuring creatures infected by a mutated fungus
 Cordyceps – a genus of fungi often parasitic on insects and other arthropods

References

Citations

General and cited sources

External links

 
 
 

1963 films
1963 horror films
1960s science fiction horror films
Japanese natural horror films
1960s Japanese-language films
Japanese science fiction horror films
1960s monster movies
Films based on short fiction
Films set on islands
Toho tokusatsu films
Films directed by Ishirō Honda
Films produced by Tomoyuki Tanaka
Fictional fungi
Films based on adaptations
Films set on ships
1960s Japanese films
Films about vacationing